Richard L. Dunn (May 12, 1957 – September 20, 2016) was an American professional ice hockey defenseman. He played in the National Hockey League with the Buffalo Sabres, Calgary Flames, and Hartford Whalers between 1977 and 1989. In his NHL career, Dunn appeared in 483 games. He scored 36 goals and added 140 assists.

He was also a member of the US national team at the 1981 Canada Cup and 1986 Ice Hockey World Championship tournaments. Dunn died on September 20, 2016, aged 59.

Career statistics

Regular season and playoffs

International

References

External links

1957 births
2016 deaths
American men's ice hockey defensemen
Binghamton Whalers players
Buffalo Sabres players
Calgary Flames players
Hartford Whalers players
Hershey Bears players
Ice hockey people from Boston
Kingston Canadians players
Rochester Americans players
Undrafted National Hockey League players
Windsor Spitfires players